Ivy Rahman (7 July 1934 – 24 August 2004) was a Bangladeshi politician. She was the Women's Affairs secretary of Awami League. She was killed in the 2004 Dhaka grenade attack.

Career
Rahman was the  founding organizing secretary of Awami League's Women's wing, Mohila Awami League, established by Sheikh Mujibur Rahman in 1969. She was elected Women Affairs Secretary of Awami League Central Working Committee in 1978 and 2 years later she became the President of Mohila Awami League. She had served in those positions until 2002.

From 1996 to 2001, Ivy served as the chair of Jatiya Mohila Sangstha and Bangladesh Jatiya Mohila Samabaya Samity. She was the President of Mohila Samity and General Secretary of Bangladesh Andhakalyan Samity until her death.

Personal life
Ivy Rahman was born in Bhairab Upazila, Kishoreganj District. She was the fifth among the eleven children of the Principal of Dhaka College, Jalal Uddin Ahmed and Hasina Begum. Her elder sister Shamsur Nahar Siddique is the mother-in-law of Bangladesh Awami League politician Sheikh Rehana.
She married fellow Awami League politician Zillur Rahman on 27 June 1958, when she was 24 years old and he was 29 years old. Zillur Rahman became the President of Bangladesh in 2009. They had two daughters - Tania and Monia and one son - Nazmul Hasan Papon. Papon is an Awami League member of parliament and president of Bangladesh Cricket Board.

Death
On 21 August 2004, Rahman was present at an Awami League political rally in Dhaka. After the speech by Sheikh Hasina ended, terrorists launched a co-ordinated grenade attack on the Awami league leaders. Ivy Rahman was injured in the grenade blast, and both of her legs were blown off. After 3 days, she died on 24 August 2004, in the Combined Military Hospital in Dhaka. She was buried in Banani Graveyard.

References

1934 births
2004 deaths
Assassinated Bangladeshi politicians
Awami League politicians
Bangladeshi women in politics
Terrorism deaths in Bangladesh
Burials at Banani Graveyard
2004 murders in Bangladesh
Bangladeshi terrorism victims
Sheikh Mujibur Rahman family